No Looking Back may refer to:

Film and TV
Out of the Blue (1980 film), released in Canada as No Looking Back, directed by Dennis Hopper
No Looking Back (1998 film), a film directed by Edward Burns
No Looking Back (2021 film), a Russian dark comedy crime film
No Looking Back, documentary on Jorge Salán 2014

Music
No Lookin' Back, a 1985 album by Michael McDonald 
No Looking Back (album), a 1982 album by Gerard McMahon
No Lookin' Back, a 1990 album by Yui Asaka
No Looking Back, a 2008 album by Damita, or the title track
No Looking Back, a 1992 album by Clarence "Gatemouth" Brown
No Looking Back, a 1992 album by LaVerne Butler
No Looking Back, a 2014 album by Jorge Salán
No Lookin' Back (song) by Michael McDonald
"No Lookin' Back", song by Wes Mack from Edge of the Storm
"No Looking Back", song by Leo Sayer from the 1978 album Leo Sayer